The Seventh Bullet (translit. Sedmaya pulya) is a Soviet Ostern film of 1972 directed by Ali Khamraev.

Plot
In the same tradition as The White Sun of the Desert and The Bodyguard, The Seventh Bullet is set after the Russian Civil War which ended in the 1920s when Soviet power established itself in Central Asia in the wake of the Basmachi rebellion. Despite this slight shift in emphasis and a post-war setting, The Seventh Bullet is closer to a typical war film than other Red Westerns because of a prominence of tactical resourcefulness in the development of the plot. Although of course this is a staple of many American Westerns from John Ford's cavalry series to the many Apache war films.

Despite the restoration of Soviet power in the area, Basmachis continue to arrive from across the border, bringing death and destruction to peaceful villages. One of the bands of rebels is led by Khairulla who is pitted against the militsiya (local militia) leader Maxumov. At first it seems hopeless for Maxumov as the rebels capture most of his men, winning them over to his side. He has only one strategy left; to give himself up, and try to explain to the people that Khairulla has deceived them, turning the soldiers back to revolution. Later in pursuit of his enemy, he chases Khairulla across a river. He has only one bullet left—the seventh, and he must not miss his target.

References

External links

Ostern films
1972 films
1970s Russian-language films
1972 Western (genre) films